John Hunt (1712 – March 31, 1778) was one of the Virginia Exiles, who were a group of Philadelphia area Quakers that were forcibly exiled to Winchester, Virginia during the Revolutionary War.

Prior to 1769, John Hunt was a London merchant and shipper dealing in tobacco and general merchandise. Between 1738 and 1768, John Hunt made several voyages between London, Philadelphia and Virginia.

In 1769, John Hunt, a widower, emigrated to the province of Pennsylvania with his three children: Dorothea, Elizabeth and John. The Hunt family settled near Philadelphia at Darby. John Hunt married Rachel Tory, a widow, on November 28, 1769.

Some modern writers have confused the John Hunt (1712 – 1778), who is the subject of this article, with another Quaker named John Hunt (1711 – 1729) who also lived near Philadelphia at Moorestown, New Jersey. Adding to the confusion, another Quaker minister by the name of John Hunt (1740 – 1824) also lived at Moorestown.

Notes

References
 Cloud, Morgan (2003). "Quakers, slaves and the Founders: profiling to save the Union". Mississippi Law Journal, 73: 369-421.
 Gilpin, Thomas (1848). Exiles in Virginia - account of the exile of 22 Philadelphia Quakers to Winchester, Virginia.
 Gray Vining, Elizabeth (1955).  The Virginia Exiles. (novel)
 Gummere, Amelia Mott (1922). The journal and essays of John Woolman. New York: The Macmillan Company.
 Hinshaw, William Wade and Thomas Worth Marshall (1936). Encyclopedia of American Quaker Genealogy. Ann Arbor, Michigan: Edwards Brothers.
 Hynes, Judy (1997). The descendants of John and Elizabeth (Woolman) Borton. Mount Holly, New Jersey: John Woolman Memorial Association.
 Worrall, Jay (1994). The friendly Virginians, America's first Quakers. Athens, Georgia: Iberian Publishing Co., 632 pages.

External links
 "Quakers, slaves and the Founders: profiling to save the Union", by Morgan Cloud

1712 births
1778 deaths
American Quakers
English Quakers
Businesspeople from London
Quaker ministers
18th-century Quakers
People of colonial Pennsylvania
British emigrants to the Thirteen Colonies